Abdel Hakim Abdel Samad Kamel (born October 7, 1962), known by the mononym Hakim, is an  Egyptian shaabi singer.

Biography
Hakim was born in Maghagha, a small town in el-Minya, Egypt. He grew up with the sound of working- and middle-class tradition of Egyptian Sha'abi music, and admired the great Egyptian Sha'bi singer Ahmed Adaweyah. He reportedly began singing at the age of 8, and practiced mawawīl, the vocal improvisations which often begin an Egyptian Sha'bi song. He formed a band while in high school, obtained his college degree in Cairo, and then returned to el-Minya to continue making music, before moving back to Cairo. He had collaborated with several international singers throughout his career, such as: Narada Michael Walden and Olga Tañon in 2002, James Brown in 2004 and Don Omar in 2007.

Musical styles 
 Shaabi
 Middle Eastern
 Belly dance
 Al Jeel
 Egyptian
 World music

Discography
Nazra (1992)
Nar (1994)
Efred (1997)
Hayel (1998)
Yaho (2000)
The Lion Roars – Hakim Live in America (2000)Talakik (2002)Taminy Alek (2004)El Youm Dol (2004)Kolo Yoross (2005)Lela (2006) (with James Brown and Stevie Wonder)
"Tigy Tigy" (with Don Omar) (2007)Ya Mazago'' (2011)
 Ala Wadaak (2017)

References

External links
 King of Egyptian Sha’Bi Music 
 

1962 births
Living people
20th-century Egyptian male singers
Singers who perform in Egyptian Arabic
Al-Azhar University alumni
21st-century Egyptian male singers